The 2013 Betfair World Cup of Darts was the third edition of the PDC World Cup of Darts which took place between 1–3 February 2013 at the Alsterdorfer Sporthalle in Hamburg, Germany.

England's Phil Taylor and Adrian Lewis were the defending champions after defeating Australia's Simon Whitlock and Paul Nicholson in the 2012 final, and they retained their title by defeating the Belgian brothers Ronny and Kim Huybrechts 3–1 in the final.

Format
24 countries in the PDC Order of Merit on 1 January after the 2013 PDC World Darts Championship were represented at the 2013 PDC World Cup of Darts. Each nation's top ranked player was joined by the second highest player of that country. For seeding the average rankings of the players was used, with the top eight seeds heading each of the eight groups of three countries.

The 24 countries were separated into eight groups of three. Each team played one best of nine leg match against the other two in their group. The top two from each group advanced to the last 16 where the tournament became a straight knockout bracket.

Group matches and Last 16: best of nine legs doubles.
Quarter-finals and semi-finals: 2 best of seven legs singles matches. Should the tie be 1–1, then a third and final doubles tie will be played.
Final: Up to the four best of seven legs singles matches. First team to 3 points wins the title. Should the tie be 2–2, then a fifth and final doubles tie will be played.

Prize money
Prize money is per team:

Teams and seeding
The 24 teams were divided into three pools based on their rankings, with one team from each pool assigned to each group.

On 25 January, it was announced that the Philippines team of Lourence Ilagan and Christian Perez had to withdraw from the event due to travel problems and were replaced by Italy.

Pool A (Seeded Nations)

Pool B

Pool C

Results

Group stage
If teams were tied on number of wins, the tie-breakers were leg difference and then group stage average.

Group A

1 February

2 February

Group B

1 February

2 February

Group C

1 February

2 February

Group D

1 February

2 February

Group E

1 February

2 February

Group F

1 February

2 February

Group G

1 February

2 February

Group H

1 February

2 February

Knockout stage

Quarter-finals
Two best of seven legs singles matches. If the scores were tied, a best of seven legs doubles match settled the match.

Semi-finals
Two best of seven legs singles matches. If the scores were tied, a best of seven legs doubles match settled the match.

Final
Three match wins were needed to win the title. Two best of seven legs singles matches were played, followed by reverse singles matches. If the score had been level after that, a best of seven legs doubles match would have been played to determine the champion.

Television coverage
The tournament was broadcast by Sky Sports in the UK and Ireland, RTL 7 in the Netherlands and Fox Sports in Australia.

References

External links
World Cup Netzone, Schedule, results

2013
World Cup
PDC World Cup of Darts
Sports competitions in Hamburg